Helene Hegarty (born 16 June 1931) is an English former cricketer who played as a right-handed pace bowler. She appeared in 7 Test matches for England between 1954 and 1963. She played domestic cricket for Surrey.

References

External links
 
 

1931 births
Living people
People from Paddington
England women Test cricketers
Surrey women cricketers